Mark Richard is an American short story writer, novelist, screenwriter, and poet. He is the author of two award-winning short story collections, The Ice at the Bottom of the World and Charity, a bestselling novel, Fishboy, and House of Prayer No. 2: A Writer's Journey Home.

Early life 
Mark Richard was born in Lake Charles, Louisiana, and grew up in Texas and Virginia. As heard on the Diane Rehm Show on NPR: He grew up in the 1960s in a racially divided rural town in Virginia. His family was poor. He was born with deformed hips and spent years in and out of charity hospitals. When his father walked out, his mother withdrew further into a world of faith. In a new memoir "House of Prayer No. 2" he details growing up in the American South as a "The Special Child" and how the racial tensions and religious fervor of his home town animate his writing today.

He attended college at Washington and Lee University.

Career
His first book, the short story collection The Ice at the Bottom of the World, won the 1990 PEN/Ernest Hemingway Foundation Award. His short stories have appeared in The New Yorker, Harper's, Esquire, GQ, The Paris Review, The Oxford American, Grand Street, Shenandoah, The Quarterly, Equator, and Antaeus.

He is the recipient of the PEN/Ernest Hemingway Award, a National Endowment for the Arts fellowship, a Whiting Award, a New York Foundation for the Arts fellowship, the Mary Francis Hobson Medal for Arts and Letters, and a National Magazine Award for Fiction. He has been writer-in-residence at the University of California Irvine, University of Mississippi, Arizona State University, the University of the South, Sewanee, and The Writer's Voice in New York.  His journalism has appeared in The New York Times, Harper's, Spin, Esquire, George, Detour, Vogue, The Oxford American, and The Southern Review, and he has been a correspondent for the BBC. 

He has also worked as a screenwriter, writing the 2008 war drama Stop-Loss. He wrote and produced on several television series, such as Chicago Hope, The Man in the High Castle, Fear the Walking Dead and Hell on Wheels. He co-created and wrote the Showtime limited series, The Good Lord Bird, which starred Ethan Hawke as abolitionist John Brown.

Personal life
He lives in Los Angeles with his wife Jennifer Allen and their three sons.

References

External links
Podcast: Stephen Usery Interviews Mark Richard
Profile at The Whiting Foundation
 

Washington and Lee University alumni
Living people
1955 births
Writers from Lake Charles, Louisiana
20th-century American novelists
American male novelists
American male screenwriters
National Endowment for the Arts Fellows
University of California, Irvine faculty
University of Mississippi faculty
Arizona State University faculty
Sewanee: The University of the South faculty
American magazine journalists
20th-century American poets
American male poets
Hemingway Foundation/PEN Award winners
Journalists from Mississippi
Novelists from Louisiana
Novelists from Mississippi
Novelists from Arizona
Novelists from Tennessee
American male non-fiction writers
Screenwriters from California
Screenwriters from Mississippi
20th-century American male writers